Zoo/Flora is a station on the Cologne Stadtbahn line 18, located in the Cologne district of Nippes. The station lies on Riehler Straße, adjacent to nearby Cologne Zoological Garden and Flora & Botanischer Garten, after which the station is named. Also within walking distance lies a station of the Cologne Cable Car (Seilbahn).

The station was opened in 1974, substantially renovated in 2010, and consists of two side platforms with two rail tracks.

See also 
 List of Cologne KVB stations

External links 
 station info page 
 

Cologne KVB stations
Nippes, Cologne
Railway stations in Germany opened in 1974
1974 establishments in West Germany
Cologne-Bonn Stadtbahn stations